The 1931 VPI Gobblers football team represented Virginia Agricultural and Mechanical College and Polytechnic Institute in the 1931 Southern Conference football season.  The team was led by their head coach Orville Neale and finished with a record of three wins, four losses and two ties (3–4–2).

Schedule

Players
The following players were members of the 1931 football team according to the roster published in the 1932 edition of The Bugle, the Virginia Tech yearbook.

References

VPI
Virginia Tech Hokies football seasons
VPI Football